Islamic school or Islamic schools may refer to:

Madhhab, a school of thought within fiqh (Islamic jurisprudence)
Madrasa (plural madaris), any educational institution, but in the West referring those with an emphasis on religious instruction
Muslim denominations, religious denominations within Islam, such as Sunni, Khawarij and Shia